A Doll's Dream is a 1950 Norwegian animation short  film directed by Ivo Caprino. It was the first 35mm colour film made in Norway.

The film is about Lars and Lotte, two children whose father owns a music shop. The father wants them to learn to play, but instead of playing the instruments they destroy them. One night Sandman comes and makes them dream that they go up in the attic where their father's old instruments are. The instruments come alive, and play melodies. After this, Lars and Lotte no longer want to destroy the instruments, and start playing them instead.

References

External links
 
 
 En dukkedrøm at Filmweb.no (Norwegian)

1950 animated films
1950 films
1950s animated short films
1950 drama films
Films directed by Ivo Caprino
Norwegian animated short films
Norwegian short films
Norwegian drama films